Hardscrabble River is the estuary of Wilson Stream, a small river in Washington County, Maine. It changes name to Hardscrabble River at about the point where it is crossed by U.S. Route 1. This section of the stream separates Pembroke on its left bank from Dennysville and Edmunds on its right.

See also
List of rivers of Maine

References

Maine Streamflow Data from the USGS
Maine Watershed Data From Environmental Protection Agency

Rivers of Washington County, Maine
Rivers of Maine